The Women's Hockey Commissioners Association National Goalie of the Year is awarded yearly to the most outstanding goalie in NCAA Division I women's college ice hockey by the Women's Hockey Commissioners Association.

Award winners

Winners by school

References

College ice hockey goaltender awards in the United States